The NBA Academy Africa is a basketball team and academy operated by the National Basketball Association (NBA), located in Saly, Senegal. Opened in 2017, the academy offers both education and basketball trainings. Several alumni of the program have played in professional leagues. The academy is a shared program between the NBA and SEED Academy. The academy has two indoor training courts, as well as dormitories and educational facilities.

Since 2022, the academy has a program called BAL Elevate with the Basketball Africa League (BAL), that allows each BAL team to select an academy player to feature on its roster during the season. A year earlier, in 2021, Mohab Yasser became the first academy player to play in the BAL and also the first player to win the league championship.

For the following 2023 season, the NBA Academy enrolled its own team in the Road to BAL qualifiers where they played against professional teams. Despite being ineligible to qualify for the BAL, they finished with a successful 2–1 record, after beating Burundian champions Urunani and Kenyan champions KPA.

Players

2022 roster
In November 2022, the NBA Academy Africa fielded the following roster playing in the 2023 BAL qualification.

Notable alumni 
The following list features players who have played for a professional club or have played in their country's national team:

  Ibou Badji (2018) – signed with FC Barcelona B in Spain.
  Kurt-Curry Wegscheider (2019) – plays for the Central African Republic national team and NCAA college basketball.
  Mohab Yasser (2020) – first academy player to play in the BAL and to win the championship during his time with Zamalek. Yasser also plays for the Egypt national team.
  Babacar Sané (2022)– plays for the Senegal national team and was the first academy player to sign in the NBA G League in 2022.
  Ugonna Kingsley (2022) – youngest player ever to debut for the Nigerian national team and a commit for Kentucky in 2022. 
  Thierry Serge Darlan (2022) – starter for the Central African national team.

References 

National Basketball Association
Sports education and training
Basketball in Senegal
Thiès Region
Road to BAL teams
Basketball teams established in 2017